PistonHeads is a London, UK based online motoring community and premium car marketplace, featuring the latest automotive news and reviews, active discussion forums and premium cars for sale.

History
PistonHeads was founded in 1998 by David Edmonston. Originally petrolheads.co.uk, PistonHeads disrupted traditional print publishing and was one of the first to bring automotive news online.

PistonHeads quickly became a go-to website for instant access to the latest news and reviews on performance cars, with popular features like Shed of the Week and Brave Pill.

Hailed as the Mumsnet for men by The Times, the forums were born as a base for car enthusiasts in London to meet to talk about cars and quickly grew to be the largest online motoring community in the UK.

The classifieds were originally created as a tool for members to sell cars to each other amongst trustworthy enthusiasts.

Founder David Edmonston sold PistonHeads to Haymarket Media Group in 2007 for an undisclosed sum.

CarGurus acquired PistonHeads in 2019.

Business
PistonHeads is known around the world for its large and devoted online motoring community, distinctive editorial tone and bustling used car marketplace, which specialises in premium and performance cars.

Owned by CarGurus, PistonHeads operates as an independent brand, maintaining its popular forums and editorial content, while applying CarGurus’ technology to enhance the classifieds and site experience.

See also 
 List of Internet forums

References

External links
Official website

Automotive websites
British news websites
Online magazines published in the United Kingdom
British companies established in 1998
Internet forums